Manta hynei is an extinct species of manta ray that was extant in the Pliocene. Its fossils have been found in North America, specifically North Carolina and Virginia. It was first described by Jim Bourdon in 1999, as a specimen dated to the Zanclean (early Pliocene). The species is known from its distinctive fossilized teeth. Some authors have suggested, on the basis of tooth morphology, that this species should be classified in the genus Mobula instead.

References 

Fossil taxa described in 1999
Neogene fish of North America
Myliobatidae